James Ralph "Sully" Montgomery (January 12, 1901 – September 5, 1970) was an American professional football player and boxer.  Montgomery played college football for the Centre Praying Colonels of Centre College in Danville, Kentucky.  He came there from the state of Texas. Montgomery played professionally in the National Football League (NFL) for the Chicago Cardinals and  Frankford Yellow Jackets. After football, Montgomery was a professional boxer. He was the sheriff of Tarrant County, Texas from 1946 to 1952, but resigned after being convicted of tax fraud.

Montgomery played for North Side High School in Fort Worth, Texas for coach Robert L. Myers. Rogers Hornsby was on that team. Bo McMillin and Red Weaver both also played there, later meeting up with Red Roberts at Somerset (Ky.) High School. McMillin, Weaver, and Roberts joined up with Montgomery as well as Matty Bell, Bill James, and Bob Mathias from the Fort Worth high school at Centre College with their old coach Myers. The team went 7–1 in 1917, so good that Myers supposedly felt himself unable to coach them, and thus hired Charley Moran. The 1919 team went 9–0. Montgomery was a tackle on Centre's all-time football team chosen in 1935.

References

External links

1901 births
1970 deaths
American football tackles
Centre Colonels football players
Chicago Cardinals players
Frankford Yellow Jackets players
All-Southern college football players
Players of American football from Fort Worth, Texas
People from Itasca, Texas
American male boxers
20th-century American people